The following television stations broadcast on digital channel 33 in the United States:

 K23KR-D in Alton, Utah
 K33AC-D in Pawnee City, Nebraska
 K33AF-D in Ninilchik, Alaska
 K33CP-D in Gold Beach, Oregon
 K33DO-D in Vernal, Utah, on virtual channel 9, which rebroadcasts KUEN
 K33DR-D in Montpelier, Idaho
 K33DS-D in Freedom-Etna, Wyoming
 K33EA-D in Columbus, Montana
 K33EB-D in Cedar Canyon, Utah
 K33EJ-D in Walla Walla, Washington
 K33ER-D in Verdi/Mogul, Nevada
 K33FF-D in Wallace, etc., Nebraska
 K33FI-D in Akron, Colorado, on virtual channel 9, which rebroadcasts KUSA
 K33FK-D in Angel Fire, New Mexico
 K33FL-D in Las Vegas, New Mexico
 K33FO-D in Benkelman, Nebraska
 K33FS-D in La Grande, Oregon
 K33FT-D in Manti/Ephraim, Utah, on virtual channel 7, which rebroadcasts KUED
 K33FX-D in Heber/Midway, Utah, on virtual channel 7, which rebroadcasts KUED
 K33FY-D in Park City, Utah, on virtual channel 30, which rebroadcasts KUCW
 K33GA-D in Grants/Milan, New Mexico
 K33GB-D in Golconda, Nevada
 K33GC-D in Capulin, etc., New Mexico
 K33GF-D in Preston, Idaho, on virtual channel 3, which rebroadcasts KIDK
 K33GJ-D in Merlin, Oregon
 K33GM-D in Haxtun, Colorado, on virtual channel 31, which rebroadcasts KDVR
 K33GX-D in Springfield, South Dakota
 K33GZ-D in Hawthorne, Nevada
 K33HG-D in Quanah, Texas
 K33HH-D in Redding, California
 K33HO-D in Soda Springs, Idaho
 K33HX-D in Tropic & Cannonville, Utah
 K33HY-D in Basalt, Colorado
 K33IB-D in Silver Springs, Nevada
 K33ID-D in Ridgecrest, California, on virtual channel 13, which rebroadcasts KCOP-TV
 K33IM-D in Malad City, Idaho
 K33IW-D in Coaldale, Colorado
 K33IX-D in Rock Springs, Wyoming
 K33IY-D in Le Chee, etc., Arizona, on virtual channel 7, which rebroadcasts KUED
 K33IZ-D in Boulder, Utah
 K33JE-D in Modena/Beryl, etc., Utah
 K33JG-D in Peoa/Oakley, Utah
 K33JI-D in Scofield, Utah
 K33JM-D in Mooreland, etc., Oklahoma
 K33JQ-D in Big Piney, etc., Wyoming
 K33JW-D in Rockville/Springdale, Utah
 K33KD-D in London Springs, Oregon
 K33KE-D in Sargents, Colorado, on virtual channel 4, which rebroadcasts K04DH-D
 K33KF-D in Kanarraville, etc., Utah
 K33KH-D in Nephi, Utah, on virtual channel 9, which rebroadcasts KUEN
 K33KI-D in Spring Glen, Utah
 K33KJ-D in Crested Butte, Colorado, on virtual channel 13, which rebroadcasts K13AV-D
 K33KV-D in Lamar, Colorado
 K33KW-D in Delta, etc., Utah
 K33LA-D in Duchesne, Utah, on virtual channel 7, which rebroadcasts KUED
 K33LB-D in Redwood Falls, Minnesota, on virtual channel 4, which rebroadcasts WCCO-TV
 K33LF-D in Lewiston, Montana
 K33LG-D in Bridger, etc., Montana
 K33LN-D in Minneapolis, Minnesota, on virtual channel 33
 K33LV-D in Henefer, etc., Utah
 K33LW-D in Sandpoint, Idaho
 K33LZ-D in Myrtle Point, Oregon
 K33MC-D in Forsyth, Montana
 K33MD-D in Yuma, Arizona
 K33MI-D in Aberdeen, South Dakota
 K33MJ-D in Pahrump, Nevada
 K33MN-D in Jefferson City, Missouri
 K33MW-D in Sherburn, Minnesota
 K33NM-D in Omak, etc., Washington
 K33NP-D in Russell, Kansas
 K33NV-D in Strong City, Oklahoma
 K33NX-D in Carlsbad, New Mexico
 K33NY-D in Roseburg, Oregon
 K33NZ-D in Cottonwood, Arizona
 K33OB-D in Roswell, New Mexico
 K33OD-D in Kingman, Arizona
 K33OE-D in Penasco, New Mexico
 K33OG-D in Max, Minnesota
 K33OH-D in Ferndale, etc., Montana
 K33OI-D in Hanksville, Utah
 K33OJ-D in Garfield, etc., Utah
 K33OK-D in Overton, Nevada
 K33OL-D in Fremont, Utah
 K33OM-D in Caineville, Utah
 K33OO-D in Antimony, Utah
 K33OP-D in Helena, Montana
 K33OQ-D in Escalante, Utah
 K33OR-D in St. Ignatius, Montana
 K33OU-D in Fountain Green, Utah
 K33OV-D in Whitehall, Montana
 K33OW-D in Neligh, Nebraska
 K33OX-D in Samak, Utah
 K33OZ-D in Parowan, Enoch, etc., Utah
 K33PA-D in Sterling, Colorado, on virtual channel 47, which rebroadcasts K21NZ-D
 K33PB-D in Grand Junction, Colorado
 K33PC-D in Santa Clara, Utah, on virtual channel 30, which rebroadcasts KUCW
 K33PD-D in Toquerville, Hurricane, Utah, on virtual channel 9, which rebroadcasts KUEN
 K33PE-D in Truth or Consequences, New Mexico
 K33PF-D in Beaver, etc., Utah
 K33PG-D in Socorro, New Mexico
 K33PH-D in Garrison, etc., Utah
 K33PI-D in Eureka, Nevada
 K33PJ-D in Emery, Utah
 K33PK-D in Green River, Utah
 K33PL-D in Birchdale, Minnesota
 K33PM-D in Grants Pass, Oregon
 K33PN-D in Ferron, Utah
 K33PO-D in Clear Creek, Utah
 K33PQ-D in Manila, etc, Utah
 K33PS-D in Randolph, Utah
 K33PU-D in Yuma, Colorado, on virtual channel 47, which rebroadcasts K21NZ-D
 K33PV-D in Rock Rapids, Iowa
 K33PX-D in Clarendon, Texas
 K33PZ-D in Julesburg, Colorado, on virtual channel 51, which rebroadcasts K16NJ-D
 K33QC-D in Window Rock, Arizona
 K33QD-D in Zuni Pueblo, New Mexico
 K33QF-D in Holbrook, Idaho
 K33QH-D in San Angelo, Texas
 K33QL-D in Snowmass Village, Colorado
 K40JM-D in Kanab, Utah, on virtual channel 13, which rebroadcasts KSTU
 K42DD-D in Joplin, Montana
 K44AG-D in Blanding/Monticello, Utah, on virtual channel 4, which rebroadcasts KTVX
 K46AC-D in Willmar, Minnesota, on virtual channel 4, which rebroadcasts WCCO-TV
 K49EQ-D in Cortez, etc., Colorado
 K50DB-D in Alexandria, Minnesota, on virtual channel 4, which rebroadcasts WCCO-TV
 K51BA-D in Fort Peck, Montana
 K51EF-D in Coolin, Idaho
 KBAK-TV in Bakersfield, California
 KBFD-DT in Honolulu, Hawaii
 KBIN-TV in Council Bluffs, Iowa
 KBSE-LD in Boise, etc., Idaho, an ATSC 3.0 station.
 KCCF-LD in Atascadero, California
 KCPN-LD in Amarillo, Texas
 KCWO-TV in Big Spring, Texas
 KDFX-CD in Indio/Palm Springs, California
 KDGU-LD in Ulysses, Kansas
 KDLH in Duluth, Minnesota
 KDMD in Anchorage, Alaska
 KEMY-LD in Eureka, California
 KFTS in Klamath Falls, Oregon
 KGEW-LD in Port Arthur, Texas
 KGKC-LD in Lawrence, Kansas, on virtual channel 39
 KGOF-LD in Fresno, California
 KGSC-LD in Cheyenne, Wyoming
 KHMF-LD in Fort Smith, Arkansas
 KHSB-LD in Steamboat Springs, Colorado, on virtual channel 33
 KIMA-TV in Yakima, Washington
 KJTV-CD in Lubbock, Texas
 KKPX-TV in San Jose, California, on virtual channel 65
 KLPA-TV in Alexandria, Louisiana
 KNPB in Incline Village, Nevada
 KNWA-TV in Rogers, Arkansas
 KOCB in Oklahoma City, Oklahoma
 KQHD-LD in Hardin, Montana
 KQSX-LD in Cal - Oregon, California
 KQZY-LD in Victoria, Texas
 KRCW-TV in Salem, Oregon, an ATSC 3.0 station, on virtual channel 32
 KRMA-TV in Denver, Colorado, on virtual channel 6
 KRPC-LP in Rapid City, South Dakota
 KRTN-TV in Durango, Colorado
 KSCW-DT in Wichita, Kansas
 KSSJ-LD in San Antonio, Texas
 KSUD-LD in Salt Lake City, Utah, on virtual channel 33
 KTBN-TV in Santa Ana, California, on virtual channel 40
 KTBU in Conroe, Texas, on virtual channel 55
 KTVI in St. Louis, Missouri, on virtual channel 2
 KTVO in Kirksville, Missouri
 KTVW-DT in Phoenix, Arizona, on virtual channel 33
 KUOC-LD in Enid, Oklahoma
 KUVN-DT in Garland, Texas, on virtual channel 23
 KVUE in Austin, Texas
 KVVB-LD in Lucerne Valley, California
 KWPX-TV in Bellevue, Washington, on virtual channel 33
 W33DH-D in Eau Claire, Wisconsin
 W33DN-D in Florence, South Carolina
 W33EB-D in Olive Hill, Tennessee
 W33ED-D in Vieques, Puerto Rico
 W33EG-D in Lumberton, Mississippi
 W33EH-D in Black Mountain, North Carolina
 W33EI-D in Raleigh, North Carolina, on virtual channel 46
 W33EJ-D in Moorefield, West Virginia
 W33EL-D in Caguas, Puerto Rico
 W33EM-D in Pittsburgh, Pennsylvania
 W33ER-D in Augusta, Georgia
 W33EU-D in Athens, Georgia
 W33EV-D in Valdosta, Georgia
 W41DO-D in New York, New York
 WCAC-LD in Lagrange, Georgia
 WCCT-TV in Waterbury, Connecticut, an ATSC 3.0 station, on virtual channel 20
 WCVB-TV in Boston, Massachusetts, on virtual channel 5
 WDFX-TV in Ozark, Alabama
 WDTV in Weston, West Virginia
 WFMJ-TV in Youngstown, Ohio
 WFRZ-LD in Montgomery, Alabama
 WGCT-LD in Tampa, Florida, on virtual channel 19
 WGNM in Macon, Georgia
 WGRZ in Buffalo, New York
 WHIO-TV in Dayton, Ohio
 WHUT-TV in Washington, D.C., on virtual channel 32
 WILT-LD in Wilmington, North Carolina
 WIRE-CD in Atlanta, Georgia, on virtual channel 33
 WJAN-CD in Miami, Florida, on virtual channel 41
 WJGC-LD in Jacksonville, North Carolina
 WJWN-TV in San Sebastian, Puerto Rico, on virtual channel 38
 WKAR-TV in East Lansing, Michigan
 WKHA in Hazard, Kentucky
 WKXT-LD in Knoxville, Tennessee
 WLAX in La Crosse, Wisconsin
 WMAQ-TV in Chicago, Illinois, on virtual channel 5
 WNBD-LD in Grenada, Mississippi
 WNGS-LD in Greenville, South Carolina
 WNGX-LD in Schenectady, New York
 WNXG-LD in Tallahassee, Florida, an ATSC 3.0 station.
 WOCW-LD in Charleston, West Virginia
 WOFL in Orlando, Florida, on virtual channel 35
 WOHO-CD in Holland, Michigan
 WOKZ-CD in Kalamazoo, Michigan
 WOWZ-LD in Salisbury, Maryland
 WPCT in Panama City Beach, Florida
 WPDP-CD in Cleveland, Tennessee
 WPGD-TV in Hendersonville, Tennessee, on virtual channel 50
 WPSG in Philadelphia, Pennsylvania, on virtual channel 57
 WPXH-TV in Hoover, Alabama
 WPXL-TV in New Orleans, Louisiana
 WPXX-TV in Memphis, Tennessee
 WQDT-LD in Lumberton, Mississippi
 WQHI-LD in Myrtle Beach, South Carolina
 WQIZ-LD in Ashland, Ohio
 WQPX-TV in Scranton, Pennsylvania
 WRLK-TV in Columbia, South Carolina
 WRXY-TV in Tice, Florida
 WSNS-TV in Chicago, Illinois, uses WMAQ-TV's spectrum, on virtual channel 44
 WTIU in Bloomington, Indiana, on virtual channel 30
 WTNG-CD in Lumberton-Pembroke, North Carolina
 WTSG-LD in Tifton, Georgia
 WTVZ-TV in Norfolk, Virginia
 WUJF-LD in Jacksonville, Florida
 WUNL-TV in Winston-Salem, North Carolina
 WVVC-LD in Utica, New York
 WWHB-CD in Stuart, Florida
 WXCK-LD in Chiefland, Florida

The following stations, which are no longer licensed, formerly broadcast on digital channel 33:
 K33BN in Taos, New Mexico
 K33CF-D in Wellington, Texas
 K33CQ-D in Canadian, Texas
 K33JB-D in Orderville, Utah
 K33OS-D in Granite Falls, Minnesota
 K33PW-D in Moses Lake, Washington
 K33PY-D in Round Mountain, Nevada
 KKOM-LD in Lufkin, Texas
 KMAS-LD in Denver, Colorado
 KTDS-LD in Ted's Place, Colorado
 WBXG-LD in Gainesville, Florida
 WUCU-LD in Evansville, Indiana

References

33 digital